Cruse is a surname of English origin.

There are many variant spellings, including Crewes, Crewis, Crews, Cruce, Cruise, Cruize, Crus, Cruwys, De Cruce and De Cruze.

People
 Bruce Cruse (born 1967), Australian cricketer
 Cindy Cruse-Ratcliff (born Cindy Cruse in 1963), singer-songwriter and the Director of Lakewood Church in Houston, Texas, United States
 Colin Cruse (born 1951), former Australian rules footballer
 Conor Cruise O'Brien (1917–2008), Irish politician, writer, historian and academic.
 Emmanuel Cruse (born 1968), French winemaker, a member of the Cruse family (see below)
 Harold Cruse (1916–2005), social critic and teacher of African-American studies
 Heloise Bowles Cruse (1919–1977), original author of the popular American syndicated newspaper column "Hints from Heloise"
 Hieronymous Cruse (Jeronimus Croase) (died 1687), a soldier and explorer for the Dutch East India Company in South Africa
 Howard Cruse (1944–2019), American cartoonist
 Howard Cruse (bishop) (1908–1979), Anglican Bishop of Knaresborough from 1965 to 1972
 Jack Cruise (1915–1979), Irish comedian & actor
 Susan Cruse, British television actress
 Thomas Cruse (1857–1943), United States Army brigadier general awarded the Medal of Honor
 Vicki Cruse (1967–2009), American aerobatic pilot and administrator
 Cruse family, a family of Protestant winemakers from the Bordeaux region of France

Fictional characters
 Matt Cruse, the main character and narrator in the Airborn novel series written by Kenneth Oppel

See also
Cruise (name)
Cruse (disambiguation)

References

External links
 The Cruse/Cruwys one-name study

English-language surnames

de:Cruse
fr:Cruse